Joshua Stein could refer to:

Josh Stein (born 1966), Attorney General of North Carolina
Josh B. Stein (born 1973), American businessman

See also
Joshua Steiner, American business executive